HoneyBee 2.5 is a 2017 Malayalam language romantic drama film produced by Lal under the banner of Lal Creations. The film stars Askar Ali and Lijo Mol Jose in the lead roles along with Asif Ali, Lal, Bhavana, Lena and Harisree Asokan. The film is directed by Shyju Anthikkad. The music is composed by A. M. Jose. The screenplay was based on a story written by Lal.It was a derivative of Honey Bee 2:Celebrations.

It was a derivative of Honey Bee 2: Celebrations.The peculiarity of the film is that it was shot during the break intervals of the set of Honey Bee 2: Celebrations.

Plot 
Vishnu, a youngster who has a great potential to become an actor, is cast in a character role in the film, but for one or the other reason the character given to him slips out of his hand. He was not ready to give up and tries his maximum to take up the character. Meanwhile, Kanmani, actress Bhavana's make up artist, falls in love with him and helps him to better realise the character.

Cast 
 Askar Ali as Vishnu 
 Lijomol Jose as Kanmani 
 Asif Ali as himself
 Lal as himself
 Bhavana as herself
 Harisree Asokan as himself
 Baburaj as himself
 Sreenath Bhasi as himself
 Arun as himself
 Jean Paul Lal as himself
 Sachy as himself 
 Lena as herself
 Joy Mathew as himself
 Dileesh Pothan as Director Thomas George
 Ponnamma Babu as herself
 Balu Varghese as himself
 Indian Pallassery as Madhu
 Hareesh Perumanna as Usman
 Sreenivasan as himself
 Jayasurya as himself (cameo appearance)
 Vinayakan as himself (cameo appearance)

Soundtrack 
The music is composed by A M Jose.

 "Aminathatha"- Lal

References

External links 
 

2017 films
Indian comedy thriller films
2010s comedy thriller films
Indian sequel films
2010s Malayalam-language films
2017 comedy films
Films directed by Shyju Anthikkad